Endemoceratoidea is a superfamily of true ammonites (suborder Ammonitina).

Taxonomy 
Families included in the Endemoceratoidea are:

 Endemoceratidae
 Neocomitidae
 Pulchelliidae

References

 
Ammonitida superfamilies